Dalby is an unincorporated community in Allamakee County, Iowa, United States.

History

Dalby was founded in Center Township. A post office was opened in Dalby in 1869, and it remained in operation until it was discontinued in 1885.

The Dalby School, also called Center Township School #7, was built in 1851 and still existed in 1932.

The Norwegian Lutheran Church and an associated cemetery were located in Dalby. This church, now known as the Old East Paint Creek Lutheran Church, still operates.

Other Dalby businesses and organizations included the Scandinavian Mutual Protective Association.

References

Unincorporated communities in Allamakee County, Iowa
1869 establishments in Iowa
Populated places established in 1869
Unincorporated communities in Iowa